Cornish Orchards is a cider and juice company based at Duloe, Cornwall.

History
The company was started by Andy Atkinson in 1999 at Westnorth Manor Farm, owned by the Duchy Of Cornwall. The farm has 15 acres of its own apples, mainly heritage varieties but also buys in apples from local orchards

In 2013 the company sold in a multimillion-pound deal to a London brewing and pubs group, Fuller, Smith and Turner. Fuller's was acquired by Asahi UK in 2019 for £250m, although both Fuller's & Cornish Orchards continue to trade under their own names.

Awards
The company has won several awards for its cider, including a gold in the Campaign for Real Ale's national cider and perry championships at Reading in 2012

External links

Official Cornish Orchards website

References

Drink companies of the United Kingdom
British ciders
Cornish ciders
Companies based in Cornwall
Cider companies based in Cornwall